Sevilla is a station on Line 1 the Mexico City Metro. It is  located in the Cuauhtémoc borough in the centre of Mexico City, on Avenida Chapultepec and Sevilla street. It serves colonias Roma and Juárez.

Iconography
The station logo depicts an aqueduct. This is because above the station are the remains of a colonial era aqueduct, built in 1779, that ran between Chapultepec and Salto del Agua fountain.

General information
Sevilla was opened on 5 September 1969. The station is located near some interesting points of the city, such as the elegant tree-lined boulevard that is Paseo de la Reforma, the U.S. embassy, the Zona Rosa shopping and entertainment district, and the Torre Mayor, one of Latin America's tallest buildings.

Ridership

Nearby
Chapultepec aqueduct
Diana the Huntress Fountain, monumental fountain of Diana located at Paseo de la Reforma.
Angel of Independence, victory column on a roundabout on the major thoroughfare of Paseo de la Reforma.
Zona Rosa, neighborhood known for its shopping, nightlife, gay community and Korean community.

Exits
Northeast: Avenida Chapultepec, Colonia Juárez
Northwest: Avenida Chapultepec, Colonia Juárez
South: Avenida Chapultepec, Colonia Roma Norte

Gallery

References

External links 
 

Sevilla
Railway stations opened in 1969
1969 establishments in Mexico
Mexico City Metro stations in Cuauhtémoc, Mexico City
Accessible Mexico City Metro stations